Dave Scott may refer to:
 Dave Scott (choreographer) (born 1974), American hip-hop dance teacher, choreographer and talent developer
 Dave Scott (triathlete) (born 1954), American triathlete
 Dave Scott (American football) (born 1953), American football player

See also
David Scott (disambiguation)